was a Japanese football player. He played for Japan national team.

Club career
Horie was born in Hamamatsu on September 13, 1913. He played for Waseda WMW, which was consisted of players from his alma mater, Waseda University. At that club, he played with many futures Japan national team players, such as Motoo Tatsuhara, Yasuo Suzuki, and others.

National team career

In May 1934, when Horie was a Waseda University student, he was selected by the Japan national team for the 1934 Far Eastern Championship Games in Manila. At that competition, on May 15, he debuted against Philippines. In 1936, he was also selected by Japan for the 1936 Summer Olympics in Berlin. At the 1936 Summer Olympics, he played against Sweden, and Japan completed a come-from-behind victory. It was the first victory in the Olympics for Japan and a historic victory over one of the powerhouses, the team became later known as the "Miracle of Berlin" (ベルリンの奇跡) in Japan. In 2016, the team was selected for the Japan Football Hall of Fame. However, he fractured his right arm in the match, and could not play in the next game against Italy. He played three games for Japan until 1936.

Coaching career
After 1936 Summer Olympics, Horie retired from his playing career and joined the Asahi Shimbun. In 1951, he became a professor at his alma mater, Waseda University. He also became a manager for Waseda University and instructed many international players like Shigeo Yaegashi, Saburo Kawabuchi, Masakatsu Miyamoto, Kunishige Kamamoto, and others.

On March 29, 2003, Horie died of pneumonia in Nakano, Tokyo at the age of 89.

National team statistics

References

External links
 
 
 Japan National Football Team Database
 Japan Football Hall of Fame (Japan team at 1936 Olympics) at Japan Football Association
 
 
 

1913 births
2003 deaths
Waseda University alumni
Association football people from Shizuoka Prefecture
Japanese footballers
Japan international footballers
Olympic footballers of Japan
Footballers at the 1936 Summer Olympics
Association football defenders
Academic staff of Waseda University